Guy Olivier Nyokas (born 28 June 1986) is a French-born Congolese handball player for Olympiacos and the Congolese national team.

He participated at the 2016 European Men's Handball Championship.

Honors  
 Macedonian Handball Super League
 Winner: 2022
 Macedonian Handball Cup
 Winner: 2022

References

1986 births
Living people
French male handball players
Expatriate handball players
French expatriate sportspeople in Germany
Olympiacos H.C. players
Handball-Bundesliga players